Harry Hadley (26 October 1877 – 22 October 1947) was an English professional football player and manager. He played once for the England national team.

Playing career
Hadley was born in Barrow-in-Furness. Having had little junior football experience, he joined Halesowen in 1895 from Colley Gate United. In February 1897 he joined West Bromwich Albion where he established himself at wing-half. He won a Second Division title medal with the Baggies in 1902 and in February 1903 won his only England cap in the 4–0 win against Ireland at Molineux.

During a match against Aston Villa in September 1904, Hadley sustained a severe injury which put "grave doubt" on his ability to play again, following comments by a club director.

Having been retained at West Brom by club directors at great sacrifice, in February 1905, after 167 league games, he left the club to join Aston Villa for a fee of £250, but played just 11 times before joining Nottingham Forest in April 1906. A year later he moved again, this time to Southern League club Southampton. According to Holley & Chalk's "The Alphabet of the Saints" he was "a methodical yet energetic half-back, dedicated to looking after the forwards by supporting, feeding and directing them into advantageous positions".

At the end of the 1907–08 season he moved to Croydon Common, rejoining Halesowen in February 1910. He finished his playing career with Merthyr Town.

Managerial career
Hadley's first managerial job was with Merthyr Town where he was appointed in May 1919. He oversaw their promotion to the Football League in 1920 and guided them to 8th place in Division Three (South) in their first season. He left Merthyr in April 1922 to manage Chesterfield, but left in August the same year.

In 1924, he was named the secretary of Accrington Stanley.

In November 1927 he took over at Aberdare Athletic, who had failed to gain re-election to the Football League the previous season. He left in April 1928, returning to Merthyr Town as manager, but left again in November the same year. He began a third spell as Merthyr manager in 1930, leaving in September 1931.

His final managerial job was with Bangor City who he joined in July 1935 and left in April 1936 when he retired.

Hadley's brother Ben also played professionally for West Bromwich Albion, but had left before Harry's arrival at the Hawthorns.

Honours

As a player
West Bromwich Albion
Football League Second Division: 1901–02

References

External links

Croydon Common career details
Profile of Bangor City managers

1877 births
Footballers from Barrow-in-Furness
1947 deaths
English footballers
Association football defenders
England international footballers
Southern Football League players
Halesowen Town F.C. players
West Bromwich Albion F.C. players
Aston Villa F.C. players
Nottingham Forest F.C. players
Southampton F.C. players
Croydon Common F.C. players
Merthyr Town F.C. players
English football managers
Merthyr Town F.C. managers
Aberdare Athletic F.C. managers
Chesterfield F.C. managers
Bangor City F.C. managers
Footballers from Cumbria